The Instituto Nacional de Estadística e Informática (INEI) ("National Institute of Statistics and Informatics") is a semi-autonomous Peruvian government agency which coordinates, compiles, and evaluates statistical information for the country. Its current director is Renán Quispe Llanos.

As stated on its website, the INEI eases decision-making with the help of quality statistical information and the use of information technology and thus helps develop the society.

Censuses
The latest census performed by the INEI is the 2017 Census, which was conducted from August 22 through November 5 of that year. Its preliminary results will be released to the public in 3 months, and final results in January 2018. An earlier census is the 2007 Census.

Coding systems
In its reports INEI uses standard coding systems for geographical location (Ubicación Geográfica) and classification of economical activities (Clasificación Nacional de Actividades Económicas del Perú):
UBIGEO
ClaNAE

See also
Census in Peru

External links
INEI website

Peru
Government agencies of Peru